Letters in the Wind may refer to:
Letters in the Wind (film), a 2002 Iranian film
Letters in the Wind (2003 film), an Italian film produced by Donatella Palermo
Letters in the Wind, a 2001 Israeli documentary by Ram Loevy